Hypotrix optima is a moth of the family Noctuidae. It is found from south-eastern Arizona and central New Mexico southward to Mexico City.

The length of the forewings is 11–14 mm. Adults are on wing from mid-June to mid-July.

External links
A revision of the genus Hypotrix Guenée in North America with descriptions of four new species and a new genus (Lepidoptera, Noctuidae, Noctuinae, Eriopygini)
Images

Hypotrix
Moths described in 1920